Ingar Solty (born April 14, 1979) is a German political writer and journalist focusing on marxism, socialism and the left. He received his PhD from York University in Toronto, Canada.

Solty is a Senior Research Fellow in Foreign, Peace and Security Policy at the Rosa Luxemburg Foundation’s Institute for Critical Social Analysis in Berlin. He founded the North Atlantic Left Dialogue, an annual summit of left-wing intellectuals, also organized by the Rosalux. He is also the social movements and politics editor in the German periodical Das Argument.

Selected books
Der neue Imperialismus. Distel Verlag, Heilbronn 2004 (with Frank Deppe). 
Imperialismus. Papyrossa Verlag, Cologne 2011 (with Frank Deppe and David Salomon). 
Die USA unter Obama. Argument Verlag, Hamburg 2013.

References

External links
 The Historic Significance of the New German Left Party 

1979 births
Living people
German expatriates in Canada
German Marxists
Marxist journalists